The Humanist Party (the acronym PH was used in voting ballots but rarely read) is a minor centre-left former political party in Portugal. The party was established in March 1999. It never elected representatives to the Assembly of the Republic, the Portuguese legislature. 

The party, now only a political and civic movement after dissolving itself as a party in September 2015, is member of the Humanist International.

References

External links
Official website

1999 establishments in Portugal
Portugal
Portugal
Political parties established in 1999
Political parties in Portugal